Easson is a surname. Notable people with the surname include:

Frederick Easson (1905–1988), Scottish Episcopal Church bishop of the Diocese of Aberdeen and Orkney in Scotland, United Kingdom
Jimmy Easson "Jimmy" Easson (1906–1983), Scottish footballer who played as an inside-forward for Portsmouth in the English Football League
Mary Easson (born 1955), Australian Labor Party Member of the House of Representatives for the Division of Lowe from 1993
Michael Easson AM (born 1955), Australian businessman and former union leader